Kharaju (also Romanized as Kharājū) is a village in Qebleh Daghi Rural District, Howmeh District, Azarshahr County, East Azerbaijan Province, Iran. At the 2006 census, its population was 709, in 183 families.

References 

Populated places in Azarshahr County